John Warwick was an actor.

John Warwick may also refer to:

John Warwick Montgomery, American academic
John G. Warwick, American politician
John Warwick (Nova Scotia politician)
John Warwick (MP for Cambridge), MP for Cambridge (UK Parliament constituency)
John Warwick (MP for Northamptonshire), 1401-1406 MP for Northamptonshire (UK Parliament constituency)
John Warwick (MP for Totnes), in 1406 MP for Totnes

See also